Shubh Mangal Zyada Saavdhan is a 2020 Hindi-language romantic comedy film written and directed by Hitesh Kewalya and produced by Aanand L. Rai, Himanshu Sharma, Bhushan Kumar and Krishan Kumar under the banners Colour Yellow Productions and T-Series. A spiritual successor to the 2017 film Shubh Mangal Saavdhan, whose script was also written by Kewalya, it stars Ayushmann Khurrana alongside Jitendra Kumar, Neena Gupta, Gajraj Rao and Maanvi Gagroo. The film tells the story of a gay man and his partner, who have trouble convincing the former's parents of their relation.

Filming wrapped on 16 December 2019 in Varanasi and it was theatrically released in India on 21 February 2020.

Plot 
Aman Tripathi, an advertiser is from an orthodox middle-class family in Allahabad. His family consists of his mother Sunaina—a housewife, father Shankar—a conservative agricultural scientist; aunt, uncle and cousins. Aman lives with his boyfriend, Kartik Singh, in Delhi. One day, Sunaina asks him to attend Goggle's (Aman's sister) wedding to Ashok. Sunaina and Shankar intend to marry Aman off to a family friend's daughter, Kusum Nigam. Aman and Kartik board the train "Vivah Express", on which Aman's family are already present. On board the train, Aman and Kartik share a kiss, but are caught by Shankar. Kartik suggests to Aman about talking to his father. Shankar asks Aman to stay away from Kartik.

At Goggle's wedding, Shankar tries to keep Kartik and Aman away from each other but fails. Kartik and Aman share a kiss publicly, leaving everyone shocked. Shankar and Sunaina confront Aman, who in turn confronts them and they remain unconvinced of his sexuality. Meanwhile, Ashok refuses to marry Goggle due to Aman's sexuality. Kartik is whisked away by Chaman (Aman's paternal uncle) to the railway station; while Shankar blackmails Aman into agreeing to marry Kusum. Goggle runs away to the railway station and attempts suicide there, but Kartik stops her. Kartik convinces Goggle that she has a family who supports her. Goggle, in turn, convinces Kartik to win back Aman and reveals that she knew from childhood that Aman was gay.

While returning to Allahabad, Kusum tells Aman that she is already in love with another man called Rakesh. She gives a proposition: they will marry, but continue to live with their respective lovers in Delhi. Shankar and Sunaina decide to rechristen Aman in order to cleanse him of his "sins". Returning to Allahabad, the family is in the middle of rechristening when Goggle and Kartik appear at their home. Shankar beats Kartik up with a stick, rendering him unconscious. Goggle at the same time fights with her parents and protests that she does not want to marry. Meanwhile, Aman agrees to marry Kusum in order to save Kartik. The family starts the wedding preparations. Kartik tries to convince Aman to not marry Kusum, but Aman is unable to fight against his family.

On the day of the wedding, Shankar and Sunaina learn that the Supreme Court is going to deliver its judgment on the decriminalization of homosexuality the next day. They fight over their past lovers and realize that they have been living with each other half-heartedly. They feel that they do not want the same for their son, but decide to proceed with the wedding anyway, thinking that everything will be fine after the wedding. Kartik opens up one of Shankar's black cauliflowers and shows him that it is full of worms. He personifies the cauliflower as Shankar and the worms as his nature. Meanwhile, Kusum steals all of Sunaina's jewelry and escapes, leaving behind a letter in Aman's room. Kartik reads the letter and disguises as the 'bride'. Goggle finds this out and decides to help Aman and Kartik.

During the ceremony, Shankar suspects something is wrong, and inadvertently chases the "bride", when Kartik suddenly reveals himself to everyone's surprise. Goggle then hands over Kusum's note to Sunaina, shocking everyone. Aman confesses his love for Kartik in front of his family, and says that he knew his family were never going to understand him. He asks Shankar if their father-son relationship will change in any way just because he loves Kartik. He tells Sunaina that she had lost her son long before she lost her jewellery. At that moment, the police arrive to arrest Aman and Kartik, they caught Kusum trying to board a bus with the stolen jewellery, who in turn revealed to the police that Aman and Kartik are gay. The family tries to stop the police, but they refuse to leave that night saying Aman and Kartik may escape and they have to follow the law. Kusum returns the jewellery to Sunaina, who realizes that her son's happiness is more important and gives all of the jewellery to Kusum. Goggle's parents realize that marriage is not the most important thing in the world and give her their approval to stay single if that is what she wants to do. Shankar opens up more of his black cauliflowers and realizes that all of them are full of worms, which in turn makes him realize that his beliefs need to change.

The next day, the Supreme Court in its landmark judgement, decriminalizes homosexuality. Aman and Kartik reconcile with the family, and leave for Delhi. Shankar burns all of his black cauliflowers and drops Aman and Kartik at the railway station and tells them that even if he may not understand their love, he does not want Aman to stop living his life to its fullest. The final scene shows that Aman and Kartik will run until they can live their life happily.

Cast 
Ayushmann Khurrana as Kartik Singh
Jitendra Kumar as Aman Tripathi
Gajraj Rao as Shankar Tripathi, Aman's father
Neena Gupta as Sunaina Tripathi, Aman's mother
Manu Rishi as Chaman Tripathi, Aman's uncle
Sunita Rajwar as Champa Tripathi, Aman's aunt
Maanvi Gagroo as Rajni "Goggle" Tripathi Chatterjee, Aman's cousin
Pankhuri Awasthy Rode as Kusum Nigam, Aman's former fiancée
Neeraj Singh as Keshav Tripathi, Aman's cousin
Bhumi Pednekar as Devika Bhatt
 Haardik Gabbi as Pintu
 Mahesh Seth as Suryakant Bhatt, Devika's father
 Brij Kumar Pandey as Pandit
 Ajit Singh Palawat as Police Officer
 Bappi Lahiri in a special appearance in the song Arey Pyaar Kar Le as himself

Release
The film was released on 21 February 2020. After Indian theatres shut down mid-March due to COVID-19, The film released on Amazon Prime Video.

Soundtrack

The film's songs are composed and written by Tanishk Bagchi, Vayu and Tony Kakkar.

The song "Gabru" was originally composed by Yo Yo Honey Singh. The song was released in 2011 in the album International Villager. The song is sung by Romy & music was recreated by Tanishk Bagchi.

The song "Arey Pyaar Kar Le" was a remake of the song "Yaar Bina Chain Kahan Re" from the 1985 film Saaheb, was originally composed by Bappi Lahiri, lyrics by Anjaan and sung by Bappi Lahiri and S. Janaki then was recreated by Tanishk Bagchi.

The song "Kya Karte Thay Sajna" was originally sung by Anuradha Paudwal and Udit Narayan, composed by Anand–Milind and written by Majrooh Sultanpuri from the made-for-television film Lal Dupatta Malmal Ka. It is recreated by Tanishk Bagchi, voiced by Zara Khan and written by Vayu.

Box office
Shubh Mangal Zyada Savdhaan earned 95.5 million net at the domestic box office on its opening day. On the second day, the film collected ₹110.8 million. On the third day, the film collected ₹120.3 million taking total opening weekend collection to ₹326.6 million.

, with a gross of 72.36 crore in India and 14.03 crore overseas, the film has a worldwide gross collection of 870 million.

Reception 

Pallabi Dey Purkayastha of The Times of India praised the cast, writing that "if Ayushmann highjacks the film with his infectious energy, a mellow Jitendra balances it out with his poker-faced humour and the relatability factor that he maintains throughout the film" and "it is noteworthy as to how well the supporting cast renders its complete (and able) support to the lead pair," while critiquing that "since the film is primarily invested in the small-town drama pertaining to the taboo around same-sex relationships, the writer-director fails to tap on the elements exclusive to small cities like Allahabad" and that "while the first half is engaging, the second half loses its sheen pretty early on and could have been trimmed down by a good 20 minutes."

Anupama Chopra of Film Companion noted that, "Shubh Mangal Zyada Saavdhan wants to be both – an impassioned defense of same-sex love as well as a family entertainer. But the writing can't seamlessly blend the disparate elements."

Saibal Chatterjee of NDTV proclaimed that "The comic flights of fancy do not always take off in the right direction or land smoothly, but with the actors going all out to make the film work, some parts of Shubh Mangal Zyada Saavdhan are genuinely funny and quirky. The film may be erratic in parts, but its entertainment quotient is delightfully high for a film tackling a clash between conservatism and freedom, between tradition and modernity."

Monika Rawal Kukreja of Hindustan Times commented that "Shubh Mangal Zyada Saavdhan is an important film that talks about an important subject conveyed in the simplest manner without sounding preachy at any given point. It touches your heart, makes you laugh and stays with you for a long time."

Devesh Sharma of Filmfare gave the film a rating of 4/5 and urged the audience to "Watch the film for its hilarious comedy, slick all around performances and ultimately for its powerful message of love and acceptance."

Accolades

Notes

References

External links 

 
 

2020 films
2020 romantic comedy films
2020s Hindi-language films
Indian romantic comedy films
Indian sequel films
Indian LGBT-related films
LGBT-related romantic comedy films
T-Series (company) films
Gay-related films
2020 LGBT-related films